Kay Alexander  (born 4 June 1950) is a retired British regional BBC television newsreader, best known for presenting Midlands Today.

Early life
Alexander was born and brought up in Aldershot in Hampshire. Her mother was a doctor and her father was an aeronautical engineer and she has two brothers. After attending the independent Frensham Heights School, Alexander read English at the University of Birmingham, gaining a degree in 1973. She started a PGCE course which she did not complete.

Career

Alexander initially worked for the BBC at Pebble Mill for BBC Radio 4 (where she worked on You and Yours, Checkpoint and Woman's Hour).

She then worked on BBC Midlands Today from the 1970s onwards, at one time being a main anchor. In 1992 she left the evening slot, and mainly presented the breakfast and lunchtime bulletins, three days a week. Her regular co-presenters included Tom Coyne, Alan Towers, Sue Beardsmore and David Davies. In October 2003, the Royal Television Society presented her with a Special Award to mark thirty years in television.

Alexander, one of the Midlands' most popular and recognisable television faces, retired after presenting her last news bulletin on Midlands Today'''s lunchtime news on 30 October 2012, and the next evening appeared on air for the last time to receive her colleagues' congratulations.  She presented a report about the 50th anniversary of television programme Gardeners' World that appeared on Midlands Today on 16 June 2017 and was repeated several times on 18 June 2017 on the BBC News Channel.

Personal life
Alexander was until 2012 Chairman of the Birmingham Assay Office (the first woman to hold this position). During that time she became a Freeman of the Worshipful Company of Goldsmiths and a Freeman of the City of London. She is a former Director of the Birmingham Hippodrome and a Patron of Acorns Children's Hospice, the Mary Ann Evans Hospice, cancer charity Breast Friends and now Age UK Birmingham and Age UK Sandwell.

Alexander was appointed Member of the Order of the British Empire (MBE) in the 2013 Birthday Honours for services to broadcasting and to charity in the West Midlands.

In October 1988 Alexander married Brian Conway, a Radio Leicester breakfast radio presenter and a presenter on the East Midlands slot on Midlands Today'' from 1984–1990. She was previously married to a musician for sixteen years, having a daughter then a son in the late 1970s. In the 1980s she lived in the Birmingham suburb of Edgbaston. She currently lives near Nuneaton on the Leicestershire boundary.

References

External links
 BBC Midlands Today Profile

1950 births
Alumni of the University of Birmingham
English journalists
English radio presenters
English television presenters
Living people
Members of the Order of the British Empire
People educated at Frensham Heights School
Mass media people from Aldershot
People from Hinckley and Bosworth (district)